Eremberga is a genus of snout moths in the subfamily Phycitinae. It was described by Carl Heinrich in 1939. Some sources list it as a synonym of Zophodia, while others retain it as a valid genus.

Species
 Eremberga creabates (Dyar, 1923) 
 Eremberga insignis Heinrich, 1939 
 Eremberga leuconips (Dyar, 1925)

References

Phycitini
Pyralidae genera
Taxa named by Carl Heinrich